Ruaha Catholic University (RUCU) is a private university in Tanzania. It is located in Iringa, Tanzania. It was started by the   Tanzania Episcopal Conference.

References

External links
 

Private universities in Tanzania
St. Augustine University of Tanzania